In Greek mythology, Hecaton (Ancient Greek: Ἑκατόν) or Hecataeon, was the father of Calyce, who was seduced by the god Poseidon and bore him a son named Cycnus. This character Hecaton (meaning "hundred") is otherwise unknown, but the name may be connected with the Hecatonnesoi ("hundred islands"), in the Adramyttian Gulf.

Note

Reference 

 Gaius Julius Hyginus, Fabulae from The Myths of Hyginus translated and edited by Mary Grant. University of Kansas Publications in Humanistic Studies. Online version at the Topos Text Project.

External links
  stoics.com  (VI. xxxv. 4-xxxvii. 1)

Characters in Greek mythology